

A 
Azis
Andrea
Anelia
Alisia

D 
Desi Slava
Dzhina Stoeva

E 
Emilia
Emanuela

F 
Fiki Storaro

G 
Galena
Gergana
Gloria

I 
Ivana

K 
Kamelia
Konstantin
Krum
Krisko-Driss

M 
Malina
Milko Kalaidjiev

P 
Preslava
PoseYdon

R 
Rayna (singer)
Reni (Bulgarian singer)

S 
Sofi Marinova
 Suzanitta

T 
Toni Storaro
Tsvetelina

See also 
Bulgarian Pop-folk music
Pop-folk

Singers, pop-folk